is the fourth single of Morning Musume subgroup Tanpopo. It was released on October 20, 1999, as an 8 cm CD, and peaked at #2 on the weekly Oricon charts, charting for twelve weeks and selling 86,090 copies in its first week. The first press edition contained a special trading card.

It is the only Tanpopo single that doesn't have a B-side track and an instrumental, which are standards for Hello! Project singles. Instead, it includes three solo versions of the songs, sung by the first generation line-up of the group.

In 2002, an English-language cover ("My Love (Holy Night)") was recorded by Lalah Hathaway for the album Cover Morning Musume Hello! Project!.

Track listing

Members at the time of single 
 Aya Ishiguro (石黒彩)
 Kaori Iida (飯田圭織)
 Mari Yaguchi (矢口真里)

References

External links 
 Seinaru Kane ga Hibiku Yoru entry at the Up-Front Works official website

Tanpopo songs
1999 singles
Japanese-language songs
Songs written by Tsunku
Song recordings produced by Tsunku
1999 songs
Torch songs
Pop ballads
1990s ballads
Zetima Records singles